Kiro is an unincorporated community in Shawnee County, Kansas, United States.

Demographics
For statistical purposes, the United States Census Bureau has defined Kiro as a census-designated place (CDP).

Education
The community is served by Silver Lake USD 372 public school district.

References

Further reading

External links
 Shawnee County maps: Current, Historic, KDOT

Unincorporated communities in Shawnee County, Kansas
Unincorporated communities in Kansas